Margot Perryman (born 1938) is a British artist.

Margot Perryman was born in 1938 in Plymouth, and studied at the Harrow School of Art, which is now part of the University of Westminster, and then specialised in painting at the Slade School of Art.

Perryman's 1969 painting Arcade is in the permanent collection of the Tate Gallery.

References

External links

1938 births
Living people
20th-century English painters
20th-century English women artists
21st-century English painters
21st-century English women artists
Alumni of the Slade School of Fine Art
Alumni of the University of Westminster
English women painters
Artists from Plymouth, Devon